This is a list of awards and nominations received by Malaysian singer Yuna.

Malaysia Awards

Malaysian Book of Records

Malaysian Film Festival

Malaysian Music Awards
Malaysian Music Awards (Anugerah Industri Muzik) is an annual event similar to Grammy Awards which recognises Malaysia's finest artists.
Yuna has received 11 awards (including the special Kembara Award in 2011 and 2016).

The year indicates the ceremony year, awarding the previous year's works.

Anugerah Planet Muzik

Anugerah Planet Muzik (APM) (English: The Music Planet Awards), is an annual event held by three countries – Indonesia, Malaysia and Singapore. Each year, one of the three countries hosts the event where all artists from the three participating countries gather to compete in two main categories – Best Achievement (judged by professional judges from all three countries) and Most Popular (voted by voters from all participating countries through Short Message Service (SMS) and forms in magazines). Yuna has received 19 nominations and one special recognition.

Anugerah Juara Lagu
Anugerah Juara Lagu (AJL) (English: the Champion Song Awards), is a yearly event which recognises the musical composition of a song based on the collaborations of three parties – the lyricist, the composers, and the artist. Its weekly programme will gather singles and song nominations from various artistes where they will compete until their songs are shortlisted as finalists before ultimately being nominated to be judged by professional judges. From 1986 until 1991, finalists were chosen based on monthly winners, and from 1992 until 2008, songs were separated into three main categories – Ballad, Irama Malaysia and Ethnic Creative Song and also Pop Rock. However, from 2009 onwards, the award show was revamped and all 12 finalists were made to compete against each other regardless of category. Throughout Yuna's five years of participating, six of her songs had qualified for nomination in the show. In 2012, she won the award show's highest title, the Champion of Champions with Terukir di Bintang, her seventh Malay language song.

Anugerah Bintang Popular

Anugerah Bintang Popular Berita Harian (ABPBH) (English: Berita Harian's Most Popular Star Awards), is an award ceremony that recognises the most popular artists of the year. The award is a yearly ceremony organised by one of Malaysia's newspapers, Berita Harian. The results are entirely based on votes cast by readers. Yuna has received seven nominations and won three awards.

Era FM

EH! Stail Awards

InTrend Awards

Shout! Awards

The Shout! Awards is an entertainment award show created to celebrate the Malaysian entertainment scene which is said has rapidly developed. The award recognises people of music, television, film and radio industries, and the entertainment industry as a whole. Yuna has received thirteen nominations and won five awards including the award show highest honour, the Ultimate Shout! Award.

MACP (Music Authors’ Copyright Protection) Awards

Melodi Awards

Bella Awards

America Awards

BET Awards

The 17th BET Awards was held at the Microsoft Theater in Los Angeles, California on June 25, 2017. The ceremony celebrated achievements in entertainment and honors music, sports, television, and movies released between April 1, 2016, and March 31, 2017. The nominations were announced on May 15, 2017. Yuna has nominated for one category in 2017.

Billboard

Billboard is an American entertainment media brand owned by the Billboard-Hollywood Reporter Media Group, a division of Eldridge Industries. It publishes pieces involving news, video, opinion, reviews, events, and style, and is also known for its music charts, including the Hot 100 and Billboard 200, tracking the most popular songs and albums in different genres. It also hosts events, owns a publishing firm, and operates several TV shows.

MTV Iggy Awards

Nickelodeon Kids Choice Awards

The Nickelodeon Kids' Choice Awards (also known as the KCAs or Kids' Choice) is an annual American children's awards ceremony show that is produced by Nickelodeon. Usually held on a Saturday night in late March or early April, the show honors the year's biggest television, movie, and music acts as voted by viewers worldwide of Nickelodeon networks. Yuna has been nominated for 2 category in 2012 Nickelodeon Kids' Choice Awards

People's Choice Awards
The People's Choice Awards, officially the E! People's Choice Awards since E! took it over in April 2017, is an American awards show, recognizing people in entertainment, voted online by the general public and fans. The show has been held annually since 1975.

Rolling Stone

Rolling Stone is an American monthly magazine that focuses on popular culture. It was founded in San Francisco, California in 1967 by Jann Wenner, who is still the magazine's publisher, and the music critic Ralph J. Gleason. It was first known for its musical coverage and for political reporting by Hunter S. Thompson. In the 1990s, the magazine shifted focus to a younger readership interested in youth-oriented television shows, film actors, and popular music. In recent years, it has resumed its traditional mix of content, including music, entertainment, and politics.

Europe Awards

MTV Europe Music Awards
The MTV Europe Music Awards (EMA) is presented by MTV Networks Europe which awards prizes to musicians and performers. Conceived as an alternative to the MTV Video Music Awards and since 2011 other worldwide, regional nominations have been added.

Worldwide Awards

World Music Awards

2014 World Music Awards was a music awards ceremony that was held on May 27, 2014, at the Salle des Etoiles in Monte Carlo, Monaco. It was the 22nd edition of the show since its start in 1989, and the first ceremony since 2010, after which it went on a four-year hiatus. As of 2018, it has continued another unexplained hiatus stretching four years so far. Yuna has collected 8 nominated in 2014

Asia Awards

VIMA Music Awards

Other

References 

Yuna